Jean Monier (or Mosnier; 1600–1656) was a French painter.  He was born and died in Blois.

Monier's father also named Jean was a glass painter and early mentor. According to his earliest biographer, Jean Bernier, Monier executed for Queen Marie de Medici a copy the Virgin of the Green Cushion by Andrea Solari, which she gave to the Convent of the Cordeliers as a replacement for the original that she had accepted as a gift from the nuns. She was so impressed with his work that she rewarded him with a significant payment. He used the money to travel to Florence and Rome where he became familiar with the works of Nicolas Poussin. In 1623 Monier returned to France, and performed some additional work for Queen Marie. He then retired to briefly to Chartres, then eventually returned to Blois. Bernier also credits him with the discovery of a Holy Family by Raphael that had laid forgotten, gathering dust, in an attic of the Château de Blois. The painting rediscovered by Mosnier has been identified by Jan Sammer as The Holy Family of Francis I, Louvre inv. 604. This painting had been commissioned by Pope Leo X for Claude de France, who died at the Château de Blois in 1524. Jean Monier's son Pierre also became a painter. Monier died at Blois in 1656.

Works 
 La magnificence royale (Louvre)

References 
 Jean Bernier, Histoire de Blois, Paris, 1682, pp. 569–572
 Jan Sammer, Tommaso Vincidor and the Flemish Romanists in Late Raphael: Proceedings of the International Symposium, Madrid, 2013, p. 124-125.
 Émile Bellier de La Chavignerie et Louis Auvray, Dictionnaire général des artistes de l'école française, Paris, Renouard, 1882–1885, p. 132

External links
 Jean Mosnier (French)
Orazio and Artemisia Gentileschi, a fully digitized exhibition catalog from The Metropolitan Museum of Art Libraries, which contains material on Jean Monier (see index)

1600 births
17th-century French painters
French male painters
1656 deaths